Don't Tempt the Devil is a 1963 French-Italian crime film written and directed by Christian-Jaque and starring Bourvil,  Marina Vlady, Virna Lisi and Pierre Brasseur. It is based on the novel Les Bonnes Causes by Jean Laborde.

Plot

Cast 

 Marina Vlady as Catherine Dupré
 Bourvil  as juge Albert Gaudet
 Virna Lisi as Gina Bianchi
 Pierre Brasseur as Mr. Charles Cassidi
 Umberto Orsini as Mr. Philliet
 Jacques Mauclair as  Georges Boisset
 Hubert Deschamps as Dr. Mermet
  Raymond Devime as  Inspector Véricel
 Jacques Monod as Magnin
  Robert Vidalin as président du tribunal
  Marcel Cuvelier as  Morin
 Gilbert Gil  as Garat
 Frédéric Pottecher as  Himself
 José Luis de Vilallonga  as  Paul Dupré
  Mony Dalmès   as  Marjorie
  Hubert Noël as  Catherine's Lover
 Bernard Musson as Robert  
 Jean-Loup Philippe as   Gina's Ex-fiancé  
 Daniel Lecourtois as Lawyer
 Robert Berri as Inspector

References

External links

Don't Tempt the Devil at Variety Distribution

 
French crime films
Italian crime films 
Films directed by Christian-Jaque
1960s French-language films
1960s French films
1960s Italian films